Knowledge entrepreneurship describes the ability to recognize or create an opportunity and take action aimed at realizing an innovative knowledge practice or product. Knowledge entrepreneurship is different from 'traditional' economic entrepreneurship in that it does not aim at the realization of monetary profit but focuses on opportunities to improve production (research) and knowledge (as in personal transformation) rather than maximizing monetary profit. It has been argued that knowledge entrepreneurship is the most suitable form of entrepreneurship for not-for-profit educators, researchers and educational institutions.

The Information / Knowledge Entrepreneurship
Following Clark"entrepreneurial" can be used as a characteristic not only applied to individuals, but to organizations as social systems, as well as to projects. However, in contrast to Clark, the dynamic process of vision, and change aspects of entrepreneurship (Kuratko, 2006; Schumpeter & Opie, 1934), also known as entrepreneuring are stressed. Thus entrepreneurship is the act of pursuing new ways of doing thing in a real context, or more concretely "the essential act of entrepreneurship is new entry" (Lumpkin & Dess, 1996). Or as Brown put it: "Entrepreneurship is a process of exploiting opportunities that exist in the environment or that are created through innovation in an attempt to create value" (Brown & Ulijn, 2004, p. 5)

According to Kanter, entrepreneurs and entrepreneurial organizations "always operate at the edge of their competence, focusing more of the resources and attention on what they do not yet know (e.g. investment on R&D) than controlling what they already know. They measure themselves not by the standards of the past (how far they have come) but by visions of the future (how far they have yet to go). And they do not allow the past to serve as a restraint on the future; the mere fact that something has not worked in the past does not mean that it cannot be made to work in the future. And the mere fact that something has worked in the past does not mean that it should remain." (Kanter as in (Cornwall & Perlman, 1990, pp. 27–28).

Using McDonald (2002, pp. 12–33), the following specific set of attractors have been proposed by Senges (2007) to directly influence the knowledge entrepreneurship ability (figure 1.6): Environmental awareness describes with what practices and with what intensity the organization gathers information about its external and internal environment. The importance of this practice for the establishment of an entrepreneurial organization was also recognized by Cornwall and Perlman (1990). They write: "Scanning should be a fundamental part of every manager's job, not something that is done by top management in conjunction with the annual update of the strategic plan"(Cornwall & Perlman, 1990, p. 46). As such the concept includes activities like internal needs analysis, benchmarking and inter-organizational networking. The organizations attitude towards the risk inherent in the pursuit of all innovation is captured under the concept of risk tolerance. A factor which has not been part of McDonald's model (and which replaces the variable named analytical diligence) covers the organizations vision in the sense of entrepreneuring (Kuratko, 2006). This ability is strongly related to strategic thinking and planning, describes its culture of envisioning and scouting new developments. New project support refers to the degree to which new initiatives are institutionalized as a means of institutional development. Thereby the monetary means, as well as managerial attention given to experimental projects is looked at. Communication is the last variable taken into consideration as a major influence for knowledge entrepreneurship. The organizational style of communication and the richness of communication channels are evaluated here.

Furthermore, the organizational condition, described through its setting and its current leadership and its organizational culture are set to determine the general possibilities for knowledge entrepreneurship to occur. Thereby the organizational setting represents the basic factual being of the organization; its size, type of institution, business model, history and historic approach to innovation. Under leadership the style and values embraced by the current top decision makers, as well as the governance structure itself is evaluated. The concept of organizational culture is central to the understanding of the enabling or discouraging condition of the organization, as it adapts its attitude towards organizational learning and whether values like innovativeness, competitiveness, entrepreneurship etc. are embraced or rejected.

On the output side, knowledge entrepreneurship is set to improve innovativeness and thereby indirectly improve performance. But

Review of literature
In this section, only a few works that have been identified to have used the concrete term 'knowledge entrepreneur' (and derivates) are reviewed. Most of them have only a broad understanding of the concept and are thus only cited to give a context. The Ph.D. research conducted by McDonald (2002) seems to be the first to have proposed and tested a conceptualization of the term as defined here. In the following paragraphs it is reviewed what has been published in books and then the journal papers:

The Demos Think-Tank has published a report entitled: "Surfing the long wave: Knowledge entrepreneurship in Britain" (Leadbetter & Oakley, 2001), Colin Coulson-Thomas a Professor and Consultant has been promoting his version of the concept in various articles and workshops as well as in the book "The knowledge entrepreneur" (Coulson-Thomas, 2003), and lastly the librarian Stan Skrzeszewski (2006) wrote about knowledge entrepreneurship in the librarian context.

The Demos report is meant to influence policy planning in the UK. It starts with an overview section on entrepreneurship and why it is important to have an entrepreneurial society. It then goes on to present a collection of case studies from the UK creative IT services (gaming and animation). Even though there is no specific definition of the term given, they use knowledge entrepreneurship to indicate that the entrepreneur is starting an enterprise that is based on knowledge work.

With "The knowledge entrepreneur" Coulson-Thomas has written an interesting management consultant book. Having years of experience as business professor and board member, he brings reams of advice he has to give to the table. "The knowledge entrepreneur", has many general chapters (such as 'contemporary information problems', or 'requirements of different stakeholders'). In general this is not an academic but a practitioner oriented book; however some original concepts are worth noting. He describes knowledge-based opportunities as distinct from (classical) resource based opportunities; unfortunately there is no clear definition of a knowledge based opportunity which makes it difficult to demarcate, as all opportunities except for purely spontaneous action or intuition based opportunities are somehow knowledge based. He also puts forward a list of eleven things a knowledge entrepreneur needs to understand. It is an extensive list starting with the ability to acquire, develop, share, manage and exploit information, knowledge and understanding, and related support tools, and it ends with the ability to lead and manage knowledge workers, network organizations and virtual teams.

The third book 'The Knowledge Entrepreneur' by Stan Skrzeszewski (2006) was originally meant to be entitled "The Entrepreneurial Librarian" (Skrzeszewski, 2006, p. v), it describes practical hands-on advise for how to embrace the entrepreneurship paradigm in the librarian profession. He defines: "A knowledge entrepreneur is someone who is skilled at creating and using intellectual assets for the development of new ventures or services that will lead to personal and community wealth creation or to improved and enhanced services. The knowledge entrepreneur must have sufficient personal knowledge capital to be able to create value and/or wealth through the use of that knowledge capital" (Skrzeszewski, 2006, p. 3). The definition is rather complementary with the Wikipedia conceptualization, only the dependence on existing intellectual capital and the result of 'wealth creation and/or improved services' actually alludes to a different objective than knowledge product or service per se. He continues: "The knowledge entrepreneur must know more about the subject at hand than his or her client of boss. It does not always have to be a great deal more, and sometimes the difference is based on the ability to communicate, present, or more importantly, apply the knowledge asset" (Skrzeszewski, 2006, p. 3). Now this argument is not convincing as true knowledge entrepreneurship, as for the knowledge entrepreneur identifying and realizing an opportunity, rather than exploiting existing intellectual capital is the motivating factor. Later, when Skrzeszewski elaborates on how information technology is a key trend to be exploited by knowledge entrepreneurs, his librarian perspective shows through again: "There is a growing need and expectation for relevant and usable digital information products and services. At the same time, there is a growing problem of information overload. Therefore, there is an attendant need to organize and package information for users, to put the information in context, to provide information intermediaries and facilitators, and to digitize all forms and formats of information – all major entrepreneurial opportunities" (Skrzeszewski, 2006, p. 31).

The fourth author, McDonald (2002), has conducted his PhD research entitled "Knowledge entrepreneurship: Linking organizational learning and innovation" about a comparison of the conditions at hospitals regarding their approaches to knowledge sharing and exploration and the entry of innovations. The work is assessed as the first to develop the distinct characteristics of knowledge entrepreneurship.

Another Author that has used the theme is Jennifer Rowley. In her paper "From learning organization to knowledge entrepreneur" (Rowley, 2000) she deals with how organizational learning can be meaningfully conceptualized. Thereby she stresses learning and the usefulness of the knowledge codified. In this context she elaborates on the concept of the knowledge entrepreneur. In her understanding "an organization that is a knowledge entrepreneur recognizes the multi-faceted nature of knowledge, and the implication that this has for organization learning. Specifically, a knowledge entrepreneur understands how to interface organizational learning and systems evolution in such a way as to optimize and capitalize on its knowledge resources in pursuit of its vision" (Rowley, 2000, p. 14). This understanding expresses the role of knowledge entrepreneurship in a different way but interesting. She writes knowledge entrepreneurship serves to "build bridges between people and systems". She then goes on to list what is in her eyes important to achieve the co-evolution of system and organizational learning in tandem. These are: allow for diversity, allow for historicity and a knowledge culture, as well as appropriate systems for storage and dissemination.

A short paper entitled "It's difficult to innovate: The death of the tenured professor and the birth of the knowledge entrepreneur" (Bouchikhi & Kimberly, 2001) has been published in the Human Relations journal. The paper describes a near future where knowledge entrepreneurs are "working under a diversity of employment contracts and attachments" (Bouchikhi & Kimberly, 2001, p. 82). Therefore, "knowledge entrepreneurs will be hired and compensated based on their ability to imagine, execute, and use of the results of research to develop original educational products". The authors are dealing specifically with business and management education, for which they are painting a profoundly transformed scenario as they are "break[in] out of their institutional straight jackets and redefine their roles in the production of knowledge". According to their vision, there will be "an almost medieval hierarchy" amongst professors, with the super-star academics performing more the role of a "CEO of a firm than like the traditional professor, managing their work and their careers with extraordinary autonomy from customary university constraints" (Bouchikhi & Kimberly, 2001, p. 82).

See also
Social entrepreneurship, Political entrepreneur, Internet Entrepreneur, Entrepreneurship education, Entrepreneurial Economics

References

Bouchikhi, H. H., & Kimberly, J. J. (2001). 'It's Difficult to Innovate': The Death of the Tenured Professor and the Birth of the Knowledge Entrepreneur. Human Relations, 54(1), 77-84
Brown, T. E., & Ulijn, J. M. (2004). Innovation, entrepreneurship and culture : the interaction between technology, progress and economic growth. Cheltenham, UK ; Northampton, Mass., USA: E. Elgar Pub.
Cornwall, J. R., & Perlman, B. (1990). Organizational entrepreneurship. Homewood, Ill.: Irwin.
Coulson-Thomas, C. (2003). The Knowledge Entrepreneur: How Your Business Can Create, Manage and Profit from Intellectual Capital: Kogan Page Ltd.
Kuratko, D. F. (2006). Entrepreneurship : theory, process, practice (7th ed.). Mason, OH: Thomson South-Western.
Leadbetter, C., & Oakley, K. (2001). Surfing the Long Wave: Knowledge Entrepreneurship in Britain: Demos.
Lumpkin, G. T., & Dess, G. G. (1996). Clarifying the Entrepreneurial orientation Construct and Linking It to Performance. Academy of Management Review, 21(1), 135-172
McDonald, R. E. (2002). Knowledge entrepreneurship: linking organisational learning and innovation. University of Connecticut
Rowley, J. (2000). From learning organisation to knowledge entrepreneur. Journal of Knowledge Management, 4(1), 7-15
Senges (2007). Knowledge entrepreneurship in universities: Practice and strategy in the case of internet based innovation appropriation
Skrzeszewski, S. (2006). The Knowledge Entrepreneur: Scarecrow Press.

External links
Knowledge Entrepreneurship Website
Towards Deep Innovations in Education and Opportunity Discoveries
wealth creation
10 Best Books for Young Entrepreneurs

Entrepreneurship